Alan Benton Foster (born December 8, 1946) is an American former professional baseball player.

Baseball career
He was drafted by the Los Angeles Dodgers of Major League Baseball in the second round of the 1965 Major League Baseball Draft. 

Pitching against the Pittsburgh Pirates at Dodger Stadium on August 6, 1969, Foster surrendered a home run to Pirate left fielder Willie Stargell that cleared the right field pavilion.

Foster was involved in a three-team deal on November 18, 1974 in which he was traded along with Sonny Siebert and Rich Folkers from the Cardinals to the Padres for Ed Brinkman who had been sent to San Diego with Bob Strampe and Dick Sharon from the Detroit Tigers for Nate Colbert. Danny Breeden went from the Padres to the Cardinals to subsequently complete the transactions.

Over his career, Foster won 48 games, lost 63, and had an earned run average of 3.74. In 217 games pitched, including 148 starts, he posted 26 complete games and six shutouts. He allowed 988 hits and 383 bases on balls, with 501 strikeouts, in 1,025 innings pitched.

References

External links
 or Retrosheet

1946 births
Living people
Albuquerque Dodgers players
Baseball players from Pasadena, California
California Angels players
Cleveland Indians players
Los Angeles Dodgers players
Major League Baseball pitchers
St. Louis Cardinals players
Salt Lake City Angels players
San Diego Padres players
Santa Barbara Dodgers players
Spokane Indians players